On the Spur of the Moment is a 2011 release by Brainstorm. It is the band's ninth studio full-length release.

Track listing 
All songs written and arranged by Brainstorm

 "Below the Line" - 06:40
 "In the Blink of an Eye" - 04:31
 "Temple of Stone" - 03:26
 "In These Walls" - 05:21
 "Still Insane" - 03:50
 "Dark Life" - 04:10
 "No Saint - No Sinner" - 05:29
 "Where Your Actions Lead You to Live" - 03:30
 "A Life on Hold" - 03:08
 "My Own Hell" - 06:21
 "This Pain Is Mine" (bonus track on digipack edition)
 "The Heartless Spawn of Seed" (bonus track on digipack edition)

Personnel 
 Andy B. Franck – vocals
 Torsten Ihlenfeld – guitars, backing vocals
 Milan Loncaric – guitars, backing vocals
 Antonio Ieva – bass
 Dieter Bernert – drums

External links 
 Official website

2011 albums
Brainstorm (German band) albums
AFM Records albums